The Racing Club de Koumassi (RC Koumassi) is an ivorian football club based in Koumassi. Currently, the club plays in Ivory Coast's second Division Poule Abidjan.

Current squad
As of July 2009

Football clubs in Abidjan
1992 establishments in Ivory Coast
Association football clubs established in 1992